{{DISPLAYTITLE:C14H12O4}}
The molecular formula C14H12O4 (molar mass: 244.25 g/mol, exact mass: 244.073559 u) may refer to:

 Dioxybenzone (benzophenone-8), an organic compound used in sunscreen
 Oxyresveratrol, a stilbenoid
 Piceatannol, a stilbenoid

Molecular formulas